Paraskevi Theodorou (born March 15, 1986, in Limassol) is a Cypriot hammer thrower. Theodorou represented Cyprus at the 2008 Summer Olympics in Beijing, where she competed for the women's hammer throw. She performed the best throw of 61.00 metres on her second attempt, finishing forty-fourth overall in the qualifying rounds.

Competition record

References

External links

NBC 2008 Olympics profile

Cypriot female hammer throwers
Living people
Olympic athletes of Cyprus
Athletes (track and field) at the 2008 Summer Olympics
1986 births
Athletes (track and field) at the 2006 Commonwealth Games
Athletes (track and field) at the 2010 Commonwealth Games
Athletes (track and field) at the 2014 Commonwealth Games
Commonwealth Games competitors for Cyprus
Athletes (track and field) at the 2009 Mediterranean Games
World Athletics Championships athletes for Cyprus
Sportspeople from Limassol
Competitors at the 2007 Summer Universiade
Competitors at the 2009 Summer Universiade
Mediterranean Games competitors for Cyprus